The FC Basel 1928–29 season was their thirty sixth season since the club's foundation on 15 November 1893. The club's new chairman was Hans Rupprecht who took over the presidency from Karl Ibach at the AGM on 7 July 1928. FC Basel played their home games in the Landhof in the district Wettstein in Kleinbasel.

Overview 
The former  Hungarian international footballer Gyula Kertész was appointed as coach/manager at the beginning of the 1928–29 Serie A season. After Percy Humphreys (1913–14) and Max Breunig (1922–23), Kertész was just the third professional trainer that the club had engaged up until this point. The decision to employ a professional football trainer/manager was made because FC Basel had slipped well below the level of their local rivals Nordstern, who had qualified for the finals three times in the last five years.

Basel played a total of 29 matches in their 1928–29 season. 16 of these were in the domestic league, three were in the Swiss Cup and 10 were friendly matches. Of these 10 friendlies three were played at home in the Landhof and seven were away games. Apart from the away game against Mulhouse all other matches were in Switzerland. Basel scored 24 goals in these friendlies and conceded 32.

The 1928–29 Swiss Serie A was divided into three regional groups, each group with nine teams. The teams that won each group continue to the finals and the last placed team in each group had to play a barrage against relegation. Basel were allocated to the Central group together with the other three local clubs Concordia Basel, Nordstern Basel and Old Boys Basel. The other five teams allocated to this group were Young Boys Bern, FC Bern, Aarau, Grenchen and Solothurn. This season was a very competitive one. After a defeat against YB in the first match, it was obvious that a professional coach was at work, because the team won eight of the next ten matches. The team rose to the top of the table, thanks to the good goal scoring of their best forwards Alfred Schlecht, Karl Bielser and Alfred Enderlin. But then, an unawaited 1–4 home defeat against lower placed local rivals Concordia changed everything. In the last five matches Basel managed only three draws and were defeated twice. The top five teams ended the season within four points of each other and each team won eight of their 16 matches. With 20 points Basel ended the season in second position, just one point behind group winners Young Boys, who advanced to the finals and then won the championship.

Basel scored 48 league goals and conceded 32. Karl Bielser was the team's top league goalscorer with 15 goals, Alfred Schlecht was second top scorer with 14 goals and Alfred Enderlin scored nine. Further goal scorers were Walter Müller with four, Max Strasser with three, Paul Schaub with two and Otto Meier one.

In the Swiss Cup Basel were drawn against Baden in the preliminary round, against Bülach in the first round, but were eliminated by Concordia Basel in the second round. Concordia continued the competition and reached the semi-final, there losing to Urania Genève Sport, who won the final against Young Boys 1–0, which was played in the Stade de Frontenex in Geneva.

Players 
Squad members

Players who left the squad

Results

Legend

Friendly matches

Pre- and mid-season

Winter break to end of season

Serie A

Central Group results

Central Group table

Swiss Cup

See also 
 History of FC Basel
 List of FC Basel players
 List of FC Basel seasons

References

Sources 
 Rotblau: Jahrbuch Saison 2014/2015. Publisher: FC Basel Marketing AG. 
 Die ersten 125 Jahre. Publisher: Josef Zindel im Friedrich Reinhardt Verlag, Basel. 
 FCB team 1928–29 at fcb-archiv.ch
 Switzerland 1928-29 at RSSSF

External links
 FC Basel official site

FC Basel seasons
Basel